Anaang (Annang) is the native language of the Anaang people of Nigeria.

The Annang speaker of English tends to apply the grammatical rules of Annang in his use of English, often violating the intuition of native speakers of English.

See also
Anaang word list (Wiktionary)

References

Languages of Nigeria
Ibibio
Ibibio-Efik languages